Percy Lewis was an English football manager. He managed Hull City during July 1921–January 1923. He had a win percentage of 38.02%.

External links

Barnsley F.C. managers
Hull City A.F.C. managers
Year of death missing
Year of birth missing